Conrad of Hirsau or Hirschau (c. 1070 – c. 1150) was a German Benedictine monk and writer of the Hirsau Abbey. He is known for his literary work Dialogus super auctores, an accessus ad auctores written about 1130.

Conrad identified himself as a "modern" in literary terms. His Dialogus is "the only theoretical discussion of the technique of the accessus [ad auctores] that has come down to us from medieval times". His own selection of authors consists of Aesop (actually the versifier Phaedrus), Avianus, Boethius, Cato, Cicero, Donatus, Homer, Juvenal, Lucan, Ovid, Persius, Prosper, Prudentius, Sallust, Sedulius, Statius, Virgil and Theodulus.

Conrad has also been suggested as the author of the ascetical works, the Speculum virginum, De fructibus carnis et spiritus, Dialogus de mundi contemptu vel amore, and Allocutio ad Deum.

References

Bibliography
A. Stuber, Conradi Hirsaugiensis Dialogus super Auctores sive Didascalon (Wurzburg, 1889) 
Dialogus super auctores, Collection Latomus, XVII (Brussels, 1955) editor R. B. C. Huygens
The Cambridge History of Literary Criticism Volume 2, The Middle Ages edited by Alastair Minnis and Ian Johnson 
Leslie G. Whitbread, Conrad of Hirsau as Literary Critic, Speculum, Vol. 47, No. 2 (Apr., 1972), pp. 234–245

External links
Bautz archived version
(French)

German Benedictines
1070s births
1150s deaths
Year of birth uncertain